Harvard Beats Yale 29–29 is a 2008 documentary film by Kevin Rafferty, covering the 1968 meeting between the football teams of Yale and Harvard in their storied rivalry. The game has been called "the most famous football game in Ivy League history". Actor Tommy Lee Jones, who was a 1st-team All-Ivy League guard for Harvard that season, was interviewed for the documentary.

Story
For the first time since 1909, the football teams of Harvard and Yale were each undefeated with 6–0 records in their conference (8–0 overall) when they met for their season's final game on November 23, 1968 at Harvard Stadium.  Led by their quarterback captain Brian Dowling, nationally-ranked Yale was heavily favored to win and they quickly led the game 22–0. With two minutes remaining on the clock they still led 29–13.  As the last seconds ticked down, Harvard, coached by John Yovicsin, tied the game, scoring  16 points in the final 42 seconds.  The Harvard Crimson declared victory with a famous headline, "Harvard Beats Yale 29–29," providing the title for Rafferty’s documentary.

Production
Created essentially as a one-man production, Rafferty followed a simple production plan by inter-cutting broadcast video of the game with interviews he'd done with close to 50 of the surviving players. The broadcast video was a color kinescope of the WHDH telecast, with Don Gillis doing the play-by-play. The film was set to celebrate the 40th anniversary of the 1968 game between Yale and Harvard.

The documentary includes game footage with contemporary interviews with the men who played that day, as well as contextual commentary about the Vietnam War, the sexual revolution, Garry Trudeau's Yale cartoons, and various players' relationships with George W. Bush (Yale), Al Gore (Harvard), and Meryl Streep (Vassar).

Cast

Tommy Lee Jones – Harvard Guard
Brian Dowling – Yale Quarterback (Team Captain)
Don Gillis – Sportscaster
George Bass – Yale Tackle
Frank Champi – Harvard Quarterback
George Lalich – Harvard Quarterback
Gus Crim – Harvard Fullback
Bruce Freeman – Harvard End
Rick Frisbie – Harvard Cornerback
Vic Gatto – Harvard Halfback (Team Captain) 
Kyle Gee – Yale Tackle
J.P. Goldsmith – Yale Safety
Calvin Hill – Yale Halfback (archive footage) 
Ray Hornblower – Harvard Halfback
Ron Kell – Yale Defensive Back
Mick Kleber – Yale Guard
Bob Levin – Yale Fullback
Ted Livingston – Yale Tackle
Fred Morris – Yale Center
Ted Skowronski – Harvard Center
Bruce Weinstein – Yale End
Mike Bouscaren – Yale Linebacker
Robert Dowd – Harvard Tackle
Fritz Reed – Harvard Tackle
Pat Conway – Harvard Safety
Pete Varney – Harvard Tight End
Nick Davidson – Yale Halfback
Jim Gallagher – Yale Defensive End
Fran Gallagher – Yale Defensive End
John Ignacio – Harvard Cornerback
Del Marting – Yale End
Bruce Weinstein – Yale Tight End
Dick Williams – Yale Middle Guard
Jim Reynolds – Harvard Halfback
Pete Hall – Harvard Defensive End
Tom Peacock – Yale Tackle
Joe McKinney – Harvard Defensive End
Rick Berne – Harvard Defensive Tackle
Alex MacLean – Harvard Middle Guard
Dale Neal – Harvard Linebacker
Gary Farneti – Harvard Linebacker
Rich Mattas – Yale Tackle
Scott Robinson – Yale Defensive End
Tom Wynne – Harvard Safety
Neil Hurley – Harvard Cornerback
Mike Ananis – Harvard Cornerback
John Cramer – Harvard Defensive End
John Waldman – Yale Cornerback
Bill Kelly – Harvard Quarterback
Ken Thomas – Harvard Safety
Brad Lee – Yale Guard

Reception
The documentary received numerous positive reviews: Steven Rea of Philadelphia Inquirer wrote "Harvard Beats Yale 29–29 is a comeback story, a classic underdog yarn. But this winning doc also offers serious reflection on how events from our past continue to loom large in our lives - as regrets still counted, as lessons learned, as triumphs that awe and amaze."  J. Hoberman of Village Voice wrote "This may or may not be the greatest instance of college football ever played, but Brian's Song, Jerry Maguire, and The Longest Yard notwithstanding, Rafferty's no-frills annotated replay is the best football movie I've ever seen: A particular day in history becomes a moment out of time."  Michael Sragow of the Baltimore Sun called the film "Kevin Rafferty's magnum opus".  Mark Feeney of Boston Globe called the film "terrifically entertaining".  Manohla Dargis of the New York Times found the film to be "preposterously entertaining".  Tom Keogh of Seattle Times called it "a delightful documentary".  In greater depth, Bob Hoover of Pittsburgh Post-Gazette wrote "Despite his annoying style of lingering a bit too long on his subjects, Rafferty, mainly a TV documentary maker, pries fascinating stories and insights from the now aging players," and Kenneth Turan of Los Angeles Times wrote "A look at the legendary Nov. 23, 1968, game, "Harvard Beats Yale" is both an irresistible human story and as fine a documentary on football as "Hoop Dreams" was on basketball", calling the film "a memorable winner". He further notes that the passage of 40 years allowed a unique perspective as the players spoke about "what was not only the game of their careers but possibly the experience of their lives", and made note of how time led to other celebrity for some of the players, with Tommy Lee Jones becoming an Oscar-winning actor, Brian Dowling becoming the character "B.D." in the Doonesbury comic strip (Garry Trudeau attended Yale), and player Bob Levin remembering dating a Vassar undergraduate named Meryl Streep."

Underscoring that the film had appeal to more than just sports fans, Bruce Eder of All Movie Guide began his review with "it is only fair of this writer to point out that he cares not one whit about, and has not a scintilla of interest in football. Having said that, we can also say, without equivocation, that Kevin Rafferty's Harvard Beats Yale 29–29 is a dazzling, engrossing, must-see piece of film all about...football. Except that it's also about a lot more."

References

External links
 
 Arts of War on the Web review, November 20, 2008
 
 

2008 films
2008 documentary films
2008 independent films
American sports documentary films
American independent films
Documentary films about American football
Headlines
Harvard Crimson football
Yale Bulldogs football
2000s English-language films
2000s American films